Dark Arts is the second studio album by The Killers bassist Mark Stoermer.  It was released through his label, St. August Records on August 5, 2016. “Spare the Ones that Weep” was the first single released on July 22, 2016 followed shortly by “Are Your Stars Out?” on July 29, 2016, which was featured on Billboard’s website.

Background, development and recording 

Mark wrote "Pretend Song" with the help of his friend Merkley by playing Ping-Song (think ping pong with lyrics). Inspired by this process, Mark went on to write the rest of the album on his own, and sometimes with the help of longtime friend and co-producer, David Hopkins. By the end of 2015 writing for the record was finished. The album was recorded from July, 2015 to October of the same year at Battle Born Studios and Studio at the Palms in Las Vegas. Mixing and mastering was completed in March 2016 by Robert Root.

Regarding the development of the album, Stoermer said: “In the studio, we would joke about Zeppelin’s Kashmir and No Quarter being examples of Jimmy Page summoning the Dark Arts... That said, Friedrich Nietzsche wrote, ‘Be careful when you cast out your demons that you don’t throw away the best of yourself.’ On that level, Dark Arts means embracing all of yourself, which I wanted to do. I didn’t shy away from anything, and it’s an honest representation of me as an artist.”

Themes and influences 

Dark Arts’ thirteen songs are a mosaic of sixties-induced psychedelia, bluesy desert rock swagger and plaintive lyrical poetry, with lush cinematic orchestration. The inspiration for the album came from Mark growing up listening to the likes of The Beatles, Pink Floyd and The Who. It was important to Mark that the music could breathe and permitted for him to explore and be adventurous. There are definite differences between this record and his first album’s folk tinged roots. David Hopkins managed to bring out Mark's older influences in rock and helped him sort through and finish his ideas.

Music and lyrics 

Unlike most musicians, Stoermer, for the most part, likes to finish the lyrics to his music before finishing the musical idea. His lyrical inspiration is derived from all things art and philosophy, from the works of mythology scholar Joseph Campbell, psychologist Carl Jung and even Rembrandt's paintings. All lyrics on the album were written by Mark with the exception of “Pretend Song” which he co-wrote with Merkley. The entire album has a distinct spacey ethereal sound from start to finish.

Release 

Dark Arts was released digitally and on CD on August 5, 2016 through Mark Stoermer’s label St. August Records. 
The album was released on Vinyl on August 12, 2016 through Bong Load Records.

Track listing 

"Fingerspitzengefühl" and "What Was In Between" was dedicated to the memory of Dietrich A. Stoermer (1936 - 2015).  "Are Your Stars Out?" was inspired by and dedicated to J.D. Salinger.

Personnel 

 Mark Stoermer – vocals, guitar, bass, tanpura, percussion
 David Hopkins – piano, Hammond organ, Moog synthesizers, Fender Rhodes, vocals, additional guitar ("39 Steps")
 Rob Whited – drums, percussion
 John Wackerman – drums ("Blood and Guts")
 Tony Curtis – narrator
 John Arnold – violin
 Jenny Massey – viola
 DeAnn Letourneau – viola
 Moonlight Tran – cello
 Elena Kapustina – cello
 Nate Kimball – trombone
 Eddie Rich – saxophone
 Mike Robb – trumpet

Production 

 David Hopkins – production, horn and string arrangements
 Mark Stoermer – production
 Robert Root – additional production, recording, mixing, mastering
 Damian Taylor – mixing ("Are Your Stars Out?")
 Mark Everton Gray – recording
 Kevin Luu – additional recording
 Wyatt Boswell – technical assistance
 Rhett Boswell – birds sound sample

Design 

 Mark Stoermer – cover photo, design
 Wyatt Boswell – studio photographs
 Corlene Byrd – design

References 

2016 albums
Mark Stoermer albums